Lianhua could refer to a number of towns in China:

Lianhua, Shantou (莲华镇), in Chenghai District, Shantou, Guangdong

Written as "莲花镇":
Lianhua, Xiamen, in Tong'an District, Xiamen, Fujian
Lianhua, Qin'an County, in Qin'an County, Gansu
Lianhua, Linxia County, in Linxia County, Gansu
Lianhua, Zhaoqing, in Dinghu District, Zhaoqing, Guangdong
Lianhua, Gongcheng County, in Gongcheng Yao Autonomous County, Guangxi
Lianhua, Harbin, in Hulan District, Harbin, Heilongjiang
Lianhua, Linkou County, Heilongjiang
Lianhua, Wangkui County, Heilongjiang
Lianhua, Wuyang County, Henan
Lianhua, Changsha, in Yuelu District, Changsha, Hunan
Lianhua, Jiujiang, in Lushan District, Jiujiang, Jiangxi
Lianhua, Kaiyuan, Liaoning
Lianhua, Zigong, in Gongjing District, Zigong, Sichuan
Lianhua, Xingwen County, in Xingwen County, Sichuan
Lianhua, Jiande, Zhejiang
Lianhua, Quzhou, in Qujiang District, Quzhou, Zhejiang